Alexandra Sergeyevna Merkulova (born 25 November 1995) is a retired Russian individual rhythmic gymnast. She is the 2010 Youth Olympic Games champion and the 2012 European all-around silver medalist.

Personal life 
Merkulova is the middle child of five children. She has two older sisters, Olya and Natasha, and two younger brothers, Savva and Vasya. She is married to Igor Ozhiganov, an ice hockey player for SKA Saint Petersburg in the Kontinental Hockey League, and they have a son together.

Career 

Merkulova began rhythmic gymnastics because her mother wanted her to be a dancer, and her father wanted her to do sports—rhythmic gymnastics was the compromise. She is often compared to Alina Kabaeva in looks and in style. Merkulova said, "Alina is my greatest idol since childhood. But I have never tried to imitate her. People say that my smile is similar to hers. I think that for both of us, to smile during the performance is quite natural, because we have a great pleasure during the performance."

Merkulova's junior international debut came in 2008. After winning all-around gold at the 2008 Junior Grand Prix Final in Bratislava and in the 2010 Junior Grand Prix in Innsbruck, she won the all-around gold at the 2009 Pesaro Junior World Cup, the 2010 Saint Petersburg Junior World Cup and won 3 gold medals in team, rope and ball at the 2010 European Junior Championships. Merkulova then won gold at the inaugural Youth Olympic Games held in Singapore.

In 2011, Merkulova struggled with new routines in her first year as a senior, but eventually went to the Montpellier World Championships to compete in clubs. She won the silver medal in all-around at the last stage of the 2011 World Cup series behind teammate Daria Dmitrieva. In the event finals she won gold in clubs and three silver medals in hoop, ball and ribbon. She was absent from Russian nationals in November due to an injury.

In 2012, Merkulova won the Tashkent World Cup All-around title and the individual apparatus finals in ball, hoop and clubs. Competing with teammate Evgenia Kanaeva at the 2012 European Championships, in place of Daria Kondakova and Daria Dmitrieva who were both injured, she took the all-around silver medal. At the Grand Prix Vorarlberg in Austria in July 2012, Merkulova won the bronze medal in all-around behind Kanaeva and Dmitrieva as well as silver in the hoop finals. At the World Cup series in Minsk, she finished fourth in the all-around behind Liubov Charkashyna and won silver in the clubs final. She was named as Russia's nominal second entry for the individual all-around at the 2012 Summer Olympics in London, alongside Kanaeva, however, Dmitrieva replaced her in Russia's final entries on August 2, 2012, due to Merkulova's foot injury.

In 2013, Merkulova returned to competition after one month of training since recovering from her injury. At the Moscow Grand Prix, she finished fourth in all-around and won a silver medal in ball final. At the next Grand Prix in Holon, she placed fifth in All-around and won gold in ball final. She won bronze in All-around at the Thiais Grand Prix and silver medals in ball and clubs final. At the second World Cup series of the season, held in Lisbon, Portugal, Merkulova won silver in All-around but withdrew from the hoop event because of a sprained ankle. She also withdrew from the 2013 Sofia World Cup and was replaced by Yana Kudryavtseva. She returned to competition at the 2013 Corbeil-Essonnes World Cup, placing fourth in All-around and winning bronze medals in the hoop and ribbon finals. Merkulova was initially listed in the Russian team for the 2013 European Championships in Vienna, Austria but was later replaced by Kudryavtseva. After recovering from injury, Merkulova returned to international competition at the International Trophy "Ciutat de Barcelona" and won gold in All-around ahead of Ukrainian Alina Maksymenko. At the 2013 Summer Universiade, she won the silver in All-around behind teammate Margarita Mamun, as well as gold in ball and silver in ribbon. She placed 5th in hoop and 7th in clubs. Merkulova was seventh at the 2013 Grand Prix Brno and withdrew from the Grand Prix Final in Berlin. Viner said she had re-injured her leg from weight gain.

In April 2014, Merkulova returned to competition at the 2014 Russian Championships where she finished 8th in the all-around. In February 2015, Merkulova announced the end of her competitive sport career as a gymnast at the 2015 Grand Prix Moscow gala.

Routine music information

References

External links
 
 
 

1995 births
Living people
Russian rhythmic gymnasts
Gymnasts at the 2010 Summer Youth Olympics
People from Kemerovo
Sportspeople from Kemerovo Oblast
Medalists at the Rhythmic Gymnastics World Championships
Medalists at the Rhythmic Gymnastics European Championships
Universiade medalists in gymnastics
Universiade gold medalists for Russia
Universiade silver medalists for Russia
Youth Olympic gold medalists for Russia
Medalists at the 2013 Summer Universiade
21st-century Russian women